Wild child usually refers to a feral child; it may also refer to:

Film and television 
The Wild Child, a 1970 French film directed by François Truffaut
Wild Child (film), a 2008 teen comedy starring Emma Roberts
"Wild Child" (Recess), a television episode
"Wild Child: The Story of Feral Children", an episode of the documentary series Body Shock

Books and comics
Wild Child (book), 2021 children's nature book by Dara McAnulty
Wild Child (character), a Marvel Comics character

Music 
Wild Child (band), an American indie pop band

Albums
Wild Child (E. G. Daily album), 1985
Wild Child (Valerie Carter album), 1978
Wild Child, by the Savage Rose, 1973
Wild Child, by Tyler Bryant & The Shakedown, 2013
Wild Child, by the Untouchables, 1985
Wild Child, an EP by Zodiac Mindwarp and the Love Reaction, 1986

Songs
"Wild Child" (Ace Wilder song), 2017
"Wild Child" (Elen Levon song), 2013
"Wild Child" (Enya song), 2001
"Wild Child" (Juliet Simms song), 2012
"Wild Child" (Kenny Chesney and Grace Potter song), 2015
"Wild Child" (Moumoon song), 2012
"Wild Child" (The Ventures song), 1966
"Wild Child" (W.A.S.P song), 1985
"Wild Child", by the Black Keys from Dropout Boogie, 2022
"Wild Child", by Da Youngsta's from The Aftermath, 1993
"Wild Child", by the Doors from The Soft Parade, 1969
"Wild Child", by Hercules and Love Affair from Omnion, 2017
"Wild Child", by Juliet Simms, 2012
"Wild Child", by Kamaliya, 2017
"Wild Child", by Lou Reed from Lou Reed, 1972
"Wild Child", by Lupe Fiasco from Drogas Light, 2017
"Wild Child", by Romeo's Daughter from Romeo's Daughter, 1988
"Wild Child", by Scorpions from Pure Instinct, 1996

People 
Wildchild (broadcast personality), IK Osakioduwa (born 1979), Nigerian radio and television host
Wildchild (DJ), Roger McKenzie (1971–1995), English musician and DJ
Wildchild (rapper), Jack Brown, American rapper
Vincent Jackson (born 1983), American football wide receiver
Alexi Laiho (1979–2020), Finnish metal guitarist
Victor of Aveyron (1788 – 1828) aka Wild Child/Boy of Aveyron, a famous feral child

See also 
Wild Kids, a Swedish reality show for children